The Pittsburg Commercial Historic District, in Pittsburg, Texas, is a  historic district which was listed on the National Register of Historic Places in 2013.  It included 66 contributing buildings and one contributing site, as well as 21 non-contributing buildings. Four buildings within the district are Recorded Texas Historic Landmarks (RTHL).

The district runs along Marshall, Quitman, Jefferson, Church, and College Sts, roughly from Cypress St. to North St.

It includes works by James E. Flanders, Smith & Prager, and by Shirley Simons & Sons.  It includes Classical Revival, Queen Anne, and commercial block architecture.

Its notable buildings include:

Camp County Courthouse (RTHL #13073, 2004), 1928, 126 Church St.

Cotton Belt Depot (RTHL #9793, 1991), 1901, 170 W. Marshall St.

First United Methodist Church (RTHL #9796, 1976), 1904, 115 Mt. Pleasant St.
Former U.S. Post Office, 1925, 145 Jefferson St.
Former Pittsburg Fire Station, 1927, 132 Jefferson St.
Frank Sexton Lodge #206 of A.F. & A.M., 1931, 202 Jefferson St.
Southwestern Bell Telephone, 1940, 134 Mt. Pleasant St.

W. L. Garrett & Sons building (RTHL #9797, 1990), 1890, 102 Quitman St.

See also

National Register of Historic Places listings in Camp County, Texas
Recorded Texas Historic Landmarks in Camp County

References

External links

National Register of Historic Places in Camp County, Texas
Queen Anne architecture in Texas
Neoclassical architecture in Texas
Historic districts on the National Register of Historic Places in Texas